Stuart Rennie (born 24 April 1947) is a Scottish former footballer who played as a goalkeeper. Rennie is best known for his time at Motherwell from 1973 and 1979 where he made 174 appearances and also had spells with Falkirk and Ayr United.

References

1947 births
Living people
Scottish footballers
Motherwell F.C. players
Ayr United F.C. players
Falkirk F.C. players
Association football goalkeepers